Yegor Vsevolodovich Filipenko (born 10 April 1988) is a Belarusian professional footballer who plays for Russian club Ural Yekaterinburg as a central defender.

He spent most of his career at BATE Borisov, winning four consecutive Belarusian Premier League titles, and also spent time playing in Russia, Spain and Israel.

A full international since 2007, Filipenko has earned over 40 caps for Belarus, and scored the goal which qualified them to the 2012 Olympic tournament.

Club career

Belarus and Russia
Filipenko was born in Minsk and was part of Smena Minsk's youth team. He then joined FC BATE Borisov's youth setup, and made his senior debuts for the latter in 2006.

In 2008 Filipenko moved to Spartak Moscow, but had difficulties retaining his place in the first team following the resignation of Stanislav Cherchesov and was sent out on a number of loans to other Eastern European teams. On 27 September 2009, Filipenko scored his first and only goal for the Moscow side in a 5–0 home win against one of his former clubs Tom Tomsk.

In February 2012 Filipenko returned to former club BATE Borisov, featuring regularly and scoring a career-best three goals in 2013. He was also crowned champions of the Belarusian Premier League four times in a row while playing for BATE.

Málaga
On 5 January 2015, Filipenko signed a two-and-a-half-year contract with La Liga side Málaga CF. Five days later he was featured in their matchday squad for the first time, remaining an unused substitute in a 1–1 draw with Villarreal CF at La Rosaleda. He made his debut on the 13th, replacing Marcos Alberto Angelleri for the last 25 minutes of a 2–3 away defeat to Levante UD in the last 16 of the Copa del Rey, Málaga nonetheless advanced on aggregate. Spanish newspaper Marca named him in their worst La Liga team of the season.

Filipenko made his Spanish top-flight debut on 6 December 2015, starting in a goalless draw at Athletic Bilbao and being replaced by Juanpi at half time.

Maccabi Tel Aviv
After only 11 matches in 18 months in Spain, Filipenko signed a two-year deal at Maccabi Tel Aviv F.C. on 14 June 2016. On 7 July, he made his debut in the 1–0 away victory against ND Gorica in 2016–17 UEFA Europa League qualification.

BATE Borisov (third spell)
Filipenko rejoined BATE Borisov for the third time in the summer of 2018, remaining with the Barysaw side until January 2021. In total, he has made 236 official appearances for the team, 21 as captain.

Ural Yekaterinburg
On 8 September 2022, Filipenko joined Ural Yekaterinburg in Russia.

International career

Filipenko made his senior international debut on 12 September 2007, replacing Henadz Bliznyuk for the last 16 minutes of a 0–1 defeat to Slovenia at the Arena Petrol in Celje, for UEFA Euro 2008 qualification.

On 25 June 2011, at the finals in Denmark, Filipenko scored the only goal of the game in the Olympic Play-Off against the Czech Republic in the 88th minute.  This took Belarus to the Olympic football championship for the first time in their history. However, he did not take part in the tournament, in which Belarus were eliminated in the group stage.

His first international goal came on 10 September 2013 in a World Cup qualifier against France at the Central Stadium in Gomel, opening the scoring with a 32nd-minute header, albeit in a 2–4 defeat. On 30 March 2015, Filipenko captained the Belarusians during the first half of the goalless draw with Gabon in a friendly match in Belek, Turkey.

International goal
Scores and results list Belarus' goal tally first.

Honours
BATE Borisov
Belarusian Premier League: 2006, 2007, 2011, 2012, 2013, 2014, 2018
Belarusian Cup: 2019–20
Belarusian Super Cup: 2011, 2014

Maccabi Tel Aviv
Toto Cup : 2017–18

Shakhtyor Soligorsk
Belarusian Premier League: 2021, 2022
Belarusian Super Cup: 2021

Belarus U21 
UEFA European Under-21 Championship bronze: 2011

Career statistics

References

External links

 
 
 
 
 Profile at Voetbal International

1988 births
Footballers from Minsk
Living people
Belarusian footballers
Association football defenders
Belarus international footballers
FC BATE Borisov players
FC Spartak Moscow players
FC Tom Tomsk players
FC Sibir Novosibirsk players
Málaga CF players
Maccabi Tel Aviv F.C. players
F.C. Ashdod players
FC Shakhtyor Soligorsk players
FC Ural Yekaterinburg players
Belarusian Premier League players
Russian Premier League players
La Liga players
Israeli Premier League players
Belarusian expatriate footballers
Expatriate footballers in Russia
Belarusian expatriate sportspeople in Russia
Expatriate footballers in Spain
Belarusian expatriate sportspeople in Spain
Expatriate footballers in Israel
Belarusian expatriate sportspeople in Israel